Alpenglühen TVX was an Austrian pay-tv channel founded in 2007, offering erotic comedies from the 1970s and 1980s. The channel was discontinued in March 2012 due to a lack of economic success. It was licensed by the Austrian media authority KommAustria and operated by Alpenglühen Media GmbH, 90 percent of which was in the hands of Munich media entrepreneur Gottfried Zmeck. With his Mainstream Media AG, the Austrian-born company also hosts the pay-TV channels GoldStar TV, Heimatkanal, Hit24 and Romance TV.

Broadcasting times were daily between 21:00 p.m. and 5:30 a.m.

Distribution
First broadcasts took place in the cable network of LiWest (Austria) since 1 October 2007 and Primacom (Germany) since 15 October 2007. On 3 December 2011, the channel started its satellite distribution via the Entavio platform on Astra 19.2°E.

It was also available via Deutsche Telekom's IPTV Entertain service on channel 275 between 15 April 2010  and 1 February 2012. The channel was also broadcast in the Kabel BW offer Männerpaket and in the Männer & Sport package of NetCologne.

References

German-language television stations
Defunct television channels in Austria
Television channels and stations established in 2007
Television channels and stations disestablished in 2012
2007 establishments in Austria
2012 disestablishments in Austria
Pornographic television channels